Suramericana is the third stop on line B of the Medellín Metro going from the center of the city to the west. It is one of five stations located by the La Hueso ravine. The station is elevated and is also located near the Medellín Museum of Modern Art, the National University of Colombia, and El Volador hill. Outside the station there is the statue Monument to Life by Rodrigo Arenas Betancourt and the tiled mural Our Lady of the Macarena by Gabriel Ripol. The station was opened on 28 February 1996 as part of the inaugural section of line B, from San Javier to San Antonio.

References

External links
 Official site of Medellín Metro 

Medellín Metro stations
Railway stations opened in 1996
1996 establishments in Colombia